Moving Star Hall is a historic community building located at Johns Island, Charleston County, South Carolina. It was built about 1917, and is a crudely built, one-story, rectangular, frame, weatherboarded building.  It has a low concrete block pillar foundation and a metal-covered gable roof. Also on the property is a contributing outhouse.  The building was used by the local African-American population as a "praise house" and meeting place of the Moving Star Young Association, a religious, social, fraternal, and charitable community institution.

It was listed on the National Register of Historic Places in 1982.

References

African-American history of South Carolina
Properties of religious function on the National Register of Historic Places in South Carolina
Churches completed in 1917
Buildings and structures in Charleston County, South Carolina
National Register of Historic Places in Charleston County, South Carolina